Bishakha Datta is a film maker, activist and a former journalist. She is the co-founder and executive director of Point of View, based in Mumbai, a non-profit working in the area of gender, sexuality and women's rights. She also serves on the board of nonprofit organizations including Creating Resources for Empowerment in Action and the Wikimedia Foundation (2010-2014), where she was the first Indian to serve on the board of trustees.

Life and works 
In 1998, Datta edited And Who Will Make the Chapatis?, an overview of the all-women political panchayats formed in Maharashtra, India. In 2003, her documentary In the Flesh: three lives in prostitution was released.

References

External links 

 
 

Year of birth missing (living people)
Living people
Indian women filmmakers
Indian filmmakers
Indian feminists
Wikimedia Foundation Board of Trustees members
Indian Wikimedians
Indian documentary filmmakers
Indian women journalists
Indian women activists
20th-century Indian journalists
20th-century Indian women writers
Journalists from Maharashtra
Women writers from Maharashtra
Activists from Maharashtra
Women documentary filmmakers